Omar Array Stoutmire (born July 9, 1974) is a former American football safety in the National Football League for the Dallas Cowboys, Cleveland Browns, New York Jets, New York Giants and Washington Redskins. He played college football at Fresno State University. He was drafted by the Dallas Cowboys in the seventh round of the 1997 NFL Draft.

Early years
Stoutmire attended Long Beach Polytechnic High School, where he was a two-way player, as a defensive back and tight end. In his senior season, he received Super Prep All-American, All-Moore League, All-city and Fresno State's Scholar-Athlete of the Year honors.
 
He accepted a football scholarship from Fresno State University, where he became a starter at strong safety as a freshman. He recorded 93 tackles (2 for loss), 2 interceptions, 2 passes defensed, 2 forced fumbles, 2 fumble recoveries, one sack and one quarterback pressure. He had 20 tackles against Utah State University.

As a sophomore, he had 80 tackles (fourth on the team), 5 sacks (led the team), 8 passes defensed (second on the team) and 3 fumble recoveries. He missed 3 games with an ankle injury. He collected 12 tackles against Ohio State University and Oregon State University.

As a junior he was switched to free safety, setting the Western Athletic Conference and the school record for tackles in a season (198). He averaged 16.5 tackles per-game and had double-digit tackles in 11 out of 12 contests. He also registered 2 interceptions, 2 passes defensed, 3 quarterback pressures, one tackle for loss, one forced fumble and one fumble recovery. He had a career-high 24 tackles against the University of Utah, 23 tackles against UCLA and 20 tackles against Brigham Young University.

As a senior, he was moved back to strong safety and was named to the All-WAC team, after posting 87 tackles (2 for loss), one pass defensed and one quarterback pressure. He had 11 tackles against the University of Auburn, 15 tackles against the University of Wyoming and 12 against the University of Colorado. He ended his college eligibility with school records for career tackles (458) and most tackles in a single-season (198).

In 2013, he was inducted into the Fresno Athletic Hall of Fame.

Professional career

Dallas Cowboys
Stoutmire was selected in the seventh round (224th overall pick) of the 1997 NFL Draft by the Dallas Cowboys. As a rookie, he played strong safety in the nickel defense and displayed excellent run-support skills. When Darren Woodson sustained a knee injury, he started against the Philadelphia Eagles and registered 13 tackles—the first time a rookie started at safety for the Cowboys in a nonstrike game since Michael Downs in the 1981 season. He produced 7 special teams tackles, 2 interceptions (tied for the team lead), 2 sacks, 2 passes defensed, one forced fumble and was sixth on the team and seventh for NFL rookies in tackles with 76.

In 1998, he earned the free safety starting position over George Teague and Kenny Wheaton. In the last 4 games he lost his starting position to Teague. He made 12 starts, 77 tackles (fifth on the team), 5 tackles for loss (tied for second on the team) and 2 forced fumbles. On September 5, 1999, he was waived  because of his weaknesses in pass coverage.

Cleveland Browns
On September 6, 1999, he was claimed off waivers by the expansion Cleveland Browns. He wasn't activated for any games and was released on September 21.

New York Jets
On October 6, 1999, he signed with the New York Jets. He started at free safety for 5 games. He was cut on August 26, 2000.

New York Giants
On August 30, 2000, he was signed by the New York Giants and played in Super Bowl XXXV. In 2001, he finished second on the team in special teams tackles (15). He played in the nickel defense and special teams until 2002, when he earned the starting free safety position. In 2003, he was third on the team in tackles with a career-high 109.

In 2004, he was replaced in the starting lineup with Brent Alexander, before tearing his anterior cruciate ligament in the season opener and being placed on the injured reserve list. He was waived on February 22, 2005.

Washington Redskins (first stint)
On July 29, 2005, he signed with the Washington Redskins. He played in 12 games including both playoff games. He made four tackles and one sack, in a 17–10 playoff win against the Tampa Bay Buccaneers.

New Orleans Saints
On March 17, 2006, he signed with the New Orleans Saints. He earned the strong safety position (9 starts). He helped the team reach the playoffs, while registering 56 tackles, 5 passes defensed and 2 interceptions.

Washington Redskins (second stint)
On March 20, 2007, he returned to the Washington Redskins for his final NFL campaign. He played in 3 games after being on and off the roster during the season. He wasn't re-signed after the season.

Personal life
Stoutmire founded the North Texas Jackrabbits, a track and field program for youths. He currently coaches the Prestonwood Christian Academy track team.

References

External links
Fresno State Athletic Hall of Fame bio

1974 births
Living people
Players of American football from Pensacola, Florida
American football safeties
Fresno State Bulldogs football players
Dallas Cowboys players
Cleveland Browns players
New York Jets players
New York Giants players
Washington Redskins players
New Orleans Saints players
Long Beach Polytechnic High School alumni